Jordan Brickner Gragnano (born October 3, 1990) is an American ice hockey player. She most recently played with the Connecticut Whale in the 2019–20 season of the Premier Hockey Federation (formerly the NWHL). In 2020, she was honored with the NWHL Foundation Award.

Career 
Growing up, Brickner played on both boys' and girls' teams until she reached high school. She then attended the Hotchkiss School in Connecticut, where she played for the school's varsity girls' hockey team, serving as the team's co-captain in her senior year. During high school, she also played for the Connecticut Stars of the Connecticut Hockey Conference.

In 2009, she began studying at Colgate University, where she played for the Raiders women's ice hockey programme. In 2011, she transferred to the University of Wisconsin and played her final two years of college eligibility with the Badgers women's ice hockey program. Brickner finished her collegiate career with a total of 43 points in 140 NCAA Division I games. She was named to the All-WCHA Academic Team in 2013.

After graduating, she moved to Austria to play for DEC Salzburg Eagles in the European Women's Hockey League. After one year in Austria, she moved to Switzerland to play for HC Lugano of the Swiss Women's Hockey League A (SWHL A).

When Dani Rylan founded the National Women's Hockey League in 2015, Brickner returned to North America to sign with the NWHL's Connecticut Whale. She scored 12 points in 18 games in the NWHL's debut season, being named to the 1st NWHL All-Star Game.

After scoring seven points in the first ten games of the 2019–20 season, she was sidelined due to injury and missed the rest of the season. Hanna Beattie was named as her replacement for the 2020 NWHL All-Star Game. She was named a recipient of the 2020 NWHL Foundation Award for her contributions to growing and improving hockey culture.

In August 2020, she re-signed with the Whale for the 2020–21 NWHL season. She was the 100th player to sign for the season. One of the longest-tenured players in PHF history and a consistent top-pairing defenceman for the Whale, she is currently ninth on the league's all-time games played list.

See also
 List of Connecticut Whale (PHF) records

References

External links

1990 births
Living people
American expatriate ice hockey players in Austria
American expatriate ice hockey players in Switzerland
American women's ice hockey defensemen
Colgate Raiders women's ice hockey players
Connecticut Whale (PHF) players
European Women's Hockey League players
Ice hockey players from Illinois
People from Lake Forest, Illinois
Swiss Women's League players
Wisconsin Badgers women's ice hockey players